Lucio Sangermano (11 August 1932 – 27 October 2014) was an Italian sprinter. He competed in the men's 200 metres at the 1952 Summer Olympics.

References

External links
 

1932 births
2014 deaths
Athletes (track and field) at the 1952 Summer Olympics
Italian male sprinters
Olympic athletes of Italy
Place of birth missing
Italian Athletics Championships winners